129th Division may refer to:

129th Division (Imperial Japanese Army)
129th Division (People's Republic of China)
129th Infantry Division (Wehrmacht)

Military units and formations disambiguation pages